Charles Lloyd in the Soviet Union is a live album by jazz saxophonist Charles Lloyd recorded at the International Jazz Festival "Tallinn 1967", Kalev Sport Hall,  Tallinn, Estonia (at that time part of the USSR) in 1967 by the Charles Lloyd Quartet featuring Keith Jarrett, Ron McClure and Jack DeJohnette.

Reception
The Allmusic review by Scott Yanow awarded the album 4½ stars and states "A measure of the band's popularity is that Lloyd and his sidemen were able to have a very successful tour of the Soviet Union during a period when jazz was still being discouraged by the communists. This well-received festival appearance has four lengthy performances... and Lloyd (who has always had a soft-toned Coltrane influenced tenor style and a more distinctive voice on flute) is in top form".

Track listing

Recorded on May 14, 1967 at Kalev Sport Hall, Tallinn, Estonia, USSR

Personnel
Charles Lloyd - tenor saxophone, flute
Keith Jarrett - piano
Ron McClure - bass
Jack DeJohnette - drums

See also
Heinrich Schultz

References

Charles Lloyd (jazz musician) live albums
1967 live albums
Albums produced by George Avakian
Atlantic Records live albums